55 Days is an English history play by Howard Brenton, centred on the 1649 trial and execution of Charles I of England following the English Civil War. It premiered at the Hampstead Theatre from 18 October to 24 November 2012, in a production directed by Howard Davies and featuring Mark Gatiss as Charles, Douglas Henshall as Oliver Cromwell, Gerald Kyd as John Lilburne and Simon Kunz as Lord Fairfax.

External links
Review - Guardian
Review - Telegraph
Official website

English plays
Fiction set in 1649
Plays set in the 17th century
Plays set in London
Plays about the English Civil War
Cultural depictions of Oliver Cromwell
Plays about British royalty
2012 plays
Cultural depictions of Charles I of England